Šiauliai municipality can refer to either of these two municipalities in Lithuania:

 Šiauliai city municipality
 Šiauliai district municipality